The African Continental Free Trade Area (AfCFTA) is a free trade area encompassing most of Africa. It was established in 2018 by the African Continental Free Trade Agreement, which has 43 parties and another 11 signatories, making it the largest free-trade area by number of member states, after the World Trade Organization, and the largest in population and geographic size, spanning 1.3 billion people across the world's second largest continent.

The agreement founding AfCFTA was brokered by the African Union (AU) and signed by 44 of its 55 member states in Kigali, Rwanda on 21 March 2018.  The proposal was set to come into force 30 days after ratification by 22 of the signatory states. On 29 April 2019, the Saharawi Republic made the 22nd deposit of instruments of ratification, bringing the agreement into force on May 30; it entered its operational phase following a summit on 7 July 2019, and officially commenced 1 January 2021. AfCFTA's negotiations and implementation are overseen by a permanent secretariat based in Accra, Ghana.

Under the agreement, AfCFTA members are committed to eliminating tariffs on most goods and services over a period of 5, 10, or 13 years, depending on the country's level of development or the nature of the products. General long-term objectives include creating a single, liberalised market; reducing barriers to capital and labor to facilitate investment; developing regional infrastructure; and establishing a continental customs union. The overall aims of AfCFTA are to increase socioeconomic development, reduce poverty, and make Africa more competitive in the global economy.

The United Nations Economic Commission for Africa estimates that AfCFTA will boost intra-African trade by 52 percent by 2022. A report by the World Bank anticipates that AfCFTA could lift 30 million Africans out of extreme poverty, boost the incomes of nearly 70 million people, and generate $450 billion in income by 2035. On January 13, 2022, AfCFTA took a major step towards its objective with the establishment of the Pan-African Payments and Settlements System (PAPSS), which allows payments among companies operating in Africa to be done in any local currency.

History

Background
In 1963, the Organization of African Unity was founded by the independent states of Africa. The OAU aimed to promote cooperation between African states. The 1980 Lagos Plan of Action was adopted by the organization. The plan suggested Africa should minimize reliance upon the West by promoting intra-African trade. This began as the creation of a number of regional cooperation organizations in the different regions of Africa, such as the Southern African Development Coordination Conference. Eventually this led to the Abuja Treaty in 1991, which created the African Economic Community, an organization that promoted the development of free trade areas, customs unions, an African Central Bank, and an African common currency union.

In 2002, the OAU was succeeded by the African Union (AU), which had as one of its goals to accelerate the "economic integration of the continent".  A second goal was to "coordinate and harmonize the policies between the existing and future Regional Economic Communities for the gradual attainment of the objectives of the Union."

Negotiations

At the 2012 African Union summit in Addis Ababa, leaders agreed to create a new Continental Free Trade Area by 2017. At the 2015 AU summit in Johannesburg, the summit agreed to commence negotiations. This began a series of ten negotiating sessions which took place over the next three years.

The first negotiation forum was held in February 2016 and held eight meetings until the Summit in March 2018 in Kigali. From February 2017 on the technical working groups held four meetings, where technical issues were discussed and implemented in the draft. On March 8–9, 2018 the African Union Ministers of Trade approved the draft.

2018 Kigali Summit

In March 2018, at the 10th Extraordinary Session of the African Union on AfCFTA, three separate agreements were signed: the African Continental Free Trade Agreement, the Kigali Declaration; and the Protocol on Free Movement of Persons. The Protocol on Free Movement of Persons seeks to establish a visa-free zone within the AfCFTA countries, and support the creation of the African Union Passport.  At the summit in Kigali on 21 March 2018, 44 countries signed the AfCFTA, 47 signed the Kigali Declaration, and 30 signed the Protocol on Free Movement of People.  While a success, there were two notable holdouts: Nigeria and South Africa, the two largest economies in Africa.

One complicating factor in the negotiations was that Africa had already been divided into eight separate free trade areas and/or customs unions, each with different regulations. These regional bodies will continue to exist; the African Continental Free Trade Agreement initially seeks to reduce trade barriers between the different pillars of the African Economic Community, and eventually use these regional organizations as building blocks for the ultimate goal of an Africa-wide customs union.

Drafting of further protocols
Negotiations continued in 2018 with Phase II, including policies of investment, competition and intellectual property rights. In January 2020, AU Assembly negotiations are envisaged to be concluded. A draft is expected for the January 2020 AU Assembly.

Institutions
The following institutions were established to facilitate the implementation of the free trade area. As a result of Phase II negotiations more committees may be established via protocols.

The AfCFTA Secretariat will be responsible for coordinating the implementation of the agreement and shall be an autonomous body within the AU system. Though it will have independent legal personality, it shall work closely with the AU Commission and receive its budget from the AU. The Council of Ministers responsible for trade will decide on the location of the headquarter, structure, role and responsibilities.
The Assembly of the African Union Heads of State and Government is the highest decision-making body. It is likely to meet during the AU Summits. The Council of Ministers Responsible for Trade provides strategic trade policy oversight and ensures effective implementation and enforcement of the AfCFTA Agreement.

Several committees have been established, for trade in goods, trade in services, on rules of origin, trade remedies, non-tariff barriers, technical barriers to trade and on sanitary and phytosanitary measures. Dispute resolution rules and procedures are still being negotiated, but will presumably include designation of a dispute resolution body. The Committee of Senior Trade Officials implements the Council's decisions. The Committee is responsible for the development of programs and action plans for the implementation of the AfCFTA Agreement.

Implementation 

The AfCFTA is set to be implemented in phases, and some of the future phases still under negotiation. Phase I covers trade in goods and trade in services. Phase II covers intellectual property rights, investment and competition policy. Phase III covers E-Commerce.

At the 2018 Kigali summit, areas of agreement were found on trade protocols, dispute settlement procedures, customs cooperation, trade facilitation, and rules of origin. There was also agreement to reduce tariffs on 90% of all goods.  Each nation is permitted to exclude 3% of goods from this agreement. This was part of Phase I of the agreement, which covers goods and services liberalization. Some Phase I issues that remain to be negotiated include the schedule of tariff concessions and other specific commitments.

The 12th Extraordinary Session of the African Union on AfCFTA was called to launch the new agreement into its operational phase, which was hosted in Niamey on 7 July 2019. At its launch, five operational instruments that will govern the AfCFTA were activated: "the rules of origin; the online negotiating forum; the monitoring and elimination of non-tariff barriers; a digital payment system; and the African Trade Observatory."

Phase II and III negotiations are expected to be initiated by all AU member countries and held in successive rounds. In February 2020, the AU Assembly of Heads of State and Government decided that Phase III would begin immediately following the conclusion of Phase II negotiations, which were initially scheduled to conclude in December 2020. However, this deadline was delayed due to the COVID-19 pandemic in Africa, and a new date (December 31, 2021) was set as the deadline for the conclusion of Phase II and III negotiations. The AfCFTA officially but largely symbolically launched on January 1, 2021.

Membership

Among the 55 AU member states, 44 signed the African Continental Free Trade Agreement (consolidated text), 47 signed the Kigali Declaration and 30 signed the Protocol on Free Movement of People at the end of the 2018 Kigali Summit.  Benin, Botswana, Eritrea, Guinea-Bissau, Nigeria, and Zambia were among the 11 countries that did not initially sign the agreement.  After the 2018 Kigali summit, more signatures were added to the AfCFTA. At the 31st African Union Summit in Nouakchott on 1 July 2018, South Africa (the second largest economy of Africa), Sierra Leone, Namibia, Lesotho and Burundi joined the agreement.  In February 2019, Guinea-Bissau, Zambia and Botswana also joined. Kenya and Ghana were the first nations to ratify the agreement, depositing their ratification on 10 May 2018. 

Of the signatories, 22 needed to deposit the instrument of ratification of the agreement for it to come into effect, and this occurred on 29 April 2019 when both Sierra Leone and the Sahrawi Arab Democratic Republic deposited the agreement. As a result, the agreement came into force 30 days later on 30 May 2019. At this point, only Nigeria (the continent's largest economy), Eritrea and Benin had not signed. 

President of Nigeria Muhammadu Buhari was particularly reluctant to join the AfCFTA, fearing it would hurt Nigerian entrepreneurship and local industries, and his decision not to was praised by some local groups including the Manufacturers Association of Nigeria and the Nigeria Labour Congress. The Nigerian government intended to consult further with local businesses in order to ensure private sector buy-in to the agreement, because a key concern was whether the agreement adequately prevented anti-competitive practices such as dumping. In July 2019, just months after being re-elected to a new term, Buhari agreed to adhere the Africa free trade at the 12th extraordinary session of the assembly of the union on AfCFTA.

At the same meeting, Benin also committed to signing the agreement, leaving Eritrea as the only of the 55 African Union Member States not to sign up to the deal. Formally, Eritrea was not part of the initial agreement due to an ongoing state of war, but the 2018 peace agreement between Ethiopia and Eritrea ended the conflict and ended the barrier to Eritrean participation in the free trade agreement.

As of May 2022, there are 54 signatories, of which 43 (80%) have deposited their instruments of ratification.   Additionally, one country (Somalia) completed its domestic ratification, but had not yet deposited their ratification with the depository by May 2020.  Eritrea is the only AU member state which had not signed the agreement by 2019.

List of signatories and parties to the agreement

Other AU member states

Eritrea has not signed due to tensions with Ethiopia, but as of 2019, following the 2018 Eritrea–Ethiopia summit, the AU Commissioner for Trade and Industry expected that Eritrea would eventually sign the agreement.

Human rights assessment
A July 2017 United Nations Economic Commission for Africa report argues that the CFTA may contribute to tackling poverty and inequality as its wide scope will facilitate structural changes in African economies. It is seen as a step towards meeting the African Union’s Agenda 2063 and the Sustainable Development Goals. The document was targeted to ensuring human rights were considered within the negotiations.

According to Food and Agriculture Organization, recognizing the intersections of gender, agriculture, and trade, it is critical to ensure that the implementation of the AfCFTA addresses the nuanced and varied challenges that women face. It is vital that the operationalization of the AfCFTA agreement ensures that future trade policies, practices, and regulations promote gender equality and the empowerment of women and girls on the African continent, especially in supporting women to seize the new opportunities created ‘in agriculture’ by the AfCFTA. Implementation of the agreement that is not inclusive of women could result in a widening gender gap by negatively affecting women-led micro, small, or medium-sized enterprises and those who rely on informal trade (including cross border) for their livelihoods.

See also

 ASEAN Free Trade Area
 Central European Free Trade Agreement
 Common Market for Eastern and Southern Africa
 Commonwealth of Independent States Free Trade Area
 Comprehensive and Progressive Agreement for Trans-Pacific Partnership
 Council of Arab Economic Unity
 Free trade agreement
 Free-trade area
 Free trade areas in Europe
 Market access
 Single African Air Transport Market
 Rules of Origin
 Tariffs
 Tourism in Africa
 Tripartite Free Trade Area

Notes

Source

References

External links
 
 UNCTAD support to the African Continental Free Trade Area (AfCFTA)
African Continental Free Trade Area (AfCFTA) page on the Rules of Origin Facilitator, with member countries' status and access to legal documents.

African Union
Economy of the African Union
Free trade agreements
2018 in economics
2018 in international relations
2018 establishments in Africa
Trade blocs
Politics of Nigeria
Politics of Africa
2018 in Rwanda
March 2018 events in Africa

fr:Zone de libre-échange continentale africaine